Ahmed Zaki (16 April 1931 – 15 November 1996) was a Maldivian politician. 

He served as the speaker of People's Majlis from 1959 to 1972.
In 1972, he was appointed as Prime Minister of the Republic of Maldives. However, in March 1975, newly elected Prime Minister Zaki was arrested in a bloodless coup and was banished to a remote atoll. Observers suggested that Zaki was becoming too popular and hence posed a threat to the Nasir faction.

During the administration of Maumoon Abdul Gayoom, Zaki hold different cabinet positions, and also again the position of the speaker of People's Majlis from 1990 to 1993.

References

1931 births
1996 deaths
Prime Ministers of the Maldives
Speakers of the People's Majlis
Government ministers of the Maldives
Permanent Representatives of the Maldives to the United Nations

Alumni of St. Peter's College, Colombo